Dylan Scott Moore (born August 2, 1992) is an American professional baseball infielder and outfielder for the Seattle Mariners of Major League Baseball (MLB).

Amateur career
Moore attended El Dorado High School in Placentia, California. He then attended Cypress College for two years, before transferring to the University of Central Florida for his final two years of college. Moore was drafted by the Texas Rangers in the 7th round, 198th overall, of the 2015 MLB draft.

Professional career

Texas Rangers
Moore split his debut season of 2015 between the Class A Short Season Spokane Indians and the Class A Hickory Crawdads, posting a combined batting line of .271/.376/.454/.830 with 7 home runs and 37 RBI in 69 games.

Atlanta Braves
In 2016, Moore was traded to the Atlanta Braves on August 24. He split that season between the Hickory Crawdads, Class A-Advanced High Desert Mavericks, and the Class A-Advanced Carolina Mudcats, producing a combined batting line of .269/.379/.441/.820 with 14 home runs and 63 RBI in 128 games. Moore played for the Salt River Rafters of the Arizona Fall League after the 2016 regular season. Moore spent 2017 with the Double-A Mississippi Braves, producing a batting line of .207/.291/.292/.583 with 7 home runs and 42 RBI in 122 games.

Milwaukee Brewers

In 2018, Moore was released on March 30 and signed with the Milwaukee Brewers on April 6. Moore split the 2018 season between the Double-A Biloxi Shuckers and the Triple-A Colorado Springs Sky Sox. He hit a combined .299/.363/.522/.885 with 14 home runs and 58 RBI in 121 games. Following the 2018 regular season, Moore played for the Tomateros de Culiacan of the Mexican Pacific Winter League. Moore elected free agency after the 2018 season.

Seattle Mariners
On November 9, 2018, the Seattle Mariners signed Moore to a one-year major league contract.

In 2019, Moore made the Seattle Mariners Opening Day roster. Moore made his MLB debut on March 20, 2019, as a defensive replacement at third base during the 7th inning. Moore had one at bat, in which he drew a walk and stole a base. In 113 games, Moore hit .206 with 9 home runs, 28 RBIs, and 11 stolen bases.

In 2020, Moore improved his offensive performance and became an everyday starter for the Seattle Mariners being utilized at multiple positions.  Despite finishing the season on the concussion list, he managed to set career records in batting average, on-base percentage and slugging.  His season slash line was .255/.358/.496.

On July 26, 2021, Moore hit a 395-foot grand slam in the bottom of the eighth inning to give the Mariners an 11-8 lead over the AL West-leading Astros. They won the game by the same score, completing a comeback win from 7-0 down in the fourth inning. This was the fifth grand slam of the season for Seattle and the first in the career of Moore.

References

External links

1992 births
Living people
Baseball players from California
Biloxi Shuckers players
Carolina Mudcats players
Colorado Springs Sky Sox players
Cypress Chargers baseball players
Hickory Crawdads players
High Desert Mavericks players
Major League Baseball third basemen
Mississippi Braves players
People from Yorba Linda, California
Salt River Rafters players
Seattle Mariners players
Spokane Indians players
Tacoma Rainiers players
Tomateros de Culiacán players
American expatriate baseball players in Mexico
UCF Knights baseball players